Here Comes the Night is the third solo album for New York Dolls lead singer David Johansen.  Released in 1981, Blondie Chaplin (from Beach Boys fame) serves as the producer for the album (for Blondie Chaplin's writing contributions, his middle name William is used and he is listed as "Bill Chaplin").  Although Chaplin was a former Beach Boys member, the album and title song, "Here Comes the Night",  does not have any relationship to the Beach Boys song, "Here Comes the Night".

The album marks the first time Johansen recorded an album without a significant contribution of his fellow-New York Dolls bandmate, Sylvain Sylvain (with the exception of co-writing one song, Sylvain does not appear on the album).  Johansen also recruited the third-in-a-row producer for Here Comes the Night in an attempt to identify a unique sound, rather than a continual evolution of the New York Dolls sound.  The tracks on the album have more of a contemporary beat, which would continue to be developed into Johansen's alter-ego, Buster Poindexter.  The song "Heart of Gold" would later appear on Buster Poindexter's debut album, Buster Poindexter.

Track listing

Personnel
David Johansen - vocals, producer
Elliott Murphy - harmonica on "Heart of Gold", rhythm guitar on "Party Tonight"
Blondie Chaplin - production assistance, guitar, backing vocals
Bobby Blain - piano (2nd keyboardist of New York Dolls: 1976)
Ernie Brooks - bass
Tony Machine - drums (3rd drummer of New York Dolls 1976-77)
Othello Molineaux - steel drums on "She Loves Strangers"
Ulysses Delavega - percussion on "Marquesa de Sade"
Tommy Mandel - organ, keyboards
Technical
Barry Mraz - producer, engineer
Kate Simon - photography

1981 albums
David Johansen albums
Blue Sky Records albums